Dianella admixta, also known as the Black-anther lily or Spreading flax-lily or Black-anther flax lily, is a species of Dianella native to South-eastern Australia. It was once considered to be a subspecies or variety of Dianella revoluta.

It produces small blue flowers that bloom from August to May. It's berries and seeds are considered edible.

References

Dianella
Asparagales of Australia